Bluerock Mountain is a mountain in Western North Carolina, near the community of Bat Cave. It is split between Henderson and Rutherford counties, it is home of the Bat Cave Preserve and part of Chimney Rock State Park. Its elevation reaches .

The mountain is flanked by the Broad River to its north and Reedypatch Creek to its west. To its south is Rich Mountain and to the east is Chimney Rock Mountain. Paris Gap is the gap between it and Bald Mountain, it connects the community of Bat Cave and the town of Chimney Rock via Lake Lure Highway (US 64/US 74A/NC 9).

Bat Cave Reserve
The Rutherford County half is protected lands within the Chimney Rock State Park. Home of the Bat Cave, named after the several species of bats that inhabit the cave, it is protected as a reserve and not open to the public. The Bat Cave is the largest known granite fissure cave in North America.

References

External links
 Bat Cave Preserve | The Nature Conservancy

Mountains of North Carolina
Mountains of Henderson County, North Carolina
Protected areas of Rutherford County, North Carolina
Mountains of Rutherford County, North Carolina